The 1990–91 Divizia B was the 51st season of the second tier of the Romanian football league system.

The format has been maintained to three series, each of them having 18 teams. At the end of the season, the winners of the series promoted to Divizia A and the last four places from each series relegated to Divizia C.

Team changes

To Divizia B
Promoted from Divizia C
 Fortus Iași
 Borzești
 Gloria CFR Galați
 Callatis Mangalia
 Progresul București
 Electroputere Craiova
 Șoimii IPA Sibiu
 Montana Sinaia
 Vulturii Lugoj
 Aurul Brad
 Metalurgistul Cugir
 CIL Sighetu Marmației

Relegated from Divizia A
 Flacăra Moreni

From Divizia B
Relegated to Divizia C
 Someșul Satu Mare
 CFR Pașcani
 IMASA Sfântu Gheorghe
 Electromureș Târgu Mureș
 CS Botoșani
 Metalul Mija
 Mureșul Deva
 Viitorul Vaslui
 Constructorul Craiova
 CFR Cluj

Promoted to Divizia A
 Progresul Brăila
 Rapid București
 Gloria Bistrița

Excluded teams
Victoria București and FC Olt Scornicești were excluded due to fall of communism in December 1989. This decision was made after it was proved that the ascension of the two teams was a forced one, with the help of the communist regime. Victoria was sponsored by the Romanian Ministry of Internal Affairs (the "Miliția", Police) and FC Olt was based in the hometown of Nicolae Ceaușescu, the former general secretary of the Romanian Communist Party from 1965 to 1989.

Renamed teams
ASA Târgu Mureș was renamed as ASA Electromureș Târgu Mureș.

Teams

League tables

Serie I

Serie II

Serie III

Top scorers 
14 goals
  Adrian State (Gloria CFR Galați)

12 goals
  Ion Profir (Oțelul Galați)

11 goals
  Adrian Oprea (Gloria CFR Galați)

8 goals
  Valentin Ștefan (Gloria CFR Galați)
  Costin Maleș (Oțelul Galați)

5 goals
  Haralambie Antohi (Gloria CFR Galați)

See also 
1990–91 Divizia A

References

Liga II seasons
Romania
2